"Fieber" (German for "fever") is a song by German rock band Oomph! and the second single from their album Plastik. It features Nina Hagen in the song as well as in the video.

The music video directed by Wolf Gresenz features both the band and Nina Hagen. Both frontman Dero Goi and Hagen act as alternate ego of a woman and man who seems to be attracted by her.

Track listing
Fieber (Single version)
Fieber (Remixed by Oliver Belte)
Fieber (Remixed by Oomph!)
Fieber (Remixed by Steve Naghavi)
Unsere Rettung (Live)
Gekreuzigt (Live)

Oomph! songs
Nina Hagen songs
1999 singles
1999 songs
Songs written by Dero Goi